Ana Ferariu (born 23 July  1997) is a Romanian former basketball player. She played in the Romanian Liga Națională with CSU Brașov and later college basketball for Drexel University. One of Romania's most promising players in her youth, she was a member its junior and senior national teams and once recorded a quadruple-double in an U16 game.

Playing career
Ferariu started her career with Olimpia CSU Brașov in 2012 in the Liga Națională and played there until 2016 when she joined to the Drexel University where she played for the Drexel Dragons. On 19-20 December 2016, she was named the Rookie of the Week by the Colonial Athletic Association and the National Freshman of the Week by the United States Basketball Writers Association after scoring 18 points in just 13 minutes in a victory against Saint Joseph's.

After graduating in 2020, she rejoined Olimpia CSU Brașov while continuing her education.

National team career
Ferariu was a member of the Romanian U16, U18, U20 and senior national teams. In August 2013, she recorded a quadruple-double in an U16 game against Ireland in the 2013 FIBA Europe Under-16 Championship for Women Division B. In the game she had 23 points, 12 rebounds, 10 assists and 10 steals. In 2014, she participated at the Youth Olympics as a member of the Romanian 3x3 basketball team.

Personal life
Her younger sister, Maria, also played basketball at Drexel University. Her grandfather Gheorghe Fieraru participated at the 1964 Summer Olympics and took 4th place with the Romanian volleyball team.

Statistics

College statistics

References

External links
  Ana Ferariu at Drexel Dragons
 
 
 
 

1997 births
Living people
Romanian women's basketball players
Sportspeople from Brașov
Guards (basketball)
Drexel Dragons women's basketball players
Basketball players at the 2014 Summer Youth Olympics
Competitors at the 2019 Summer Universiade